Artyom Loskutov (born September 15, 1986) is a Russian performance artist and an activist. He is known for an annual Monstration held in Novosibirsk that gently pokes fun at Kremlin policies. He has been arrested for insulting police. In response to the incident he said, "You're not a real Russian until you've been arrested."

In 2013, Loskutov was informed by Russian authorities that he is no longer allowed to practice art and to perform as an individual artist.

Loskutov exhibited at London's Saatchi Gallery in November 2017 as part of the Art Riot exhibition.

In 2019 Loskutov allegedly organized stealing from the New York City's Central Park the plaque previously affixed to one the benches; the plaque, according to Alexei Navalny's investigation, was a gift from Russian state television anchor Nailya Asker-Zade to a prominent Russian banker Andrey Kostin. Loskutov proclaimed the plaque being a ready-made art object titled “Without love, nothing works” and sold it through an on-line auction for 1.5 million rubles ($23,600), then transferred the money to a charity.

Selected group shows
 2018 — Resist! — BOZAR/Centre for Fine Arts, Brussels, Belgium
 2018 — The Art of the 2000s — Tretyakov gallery, Moscow, Russia
 2017 — Art Riot: Post-Soviet Actionism — Saatchi Gallery, London, UK
 2017 — dis/order. Art and Activism in Russia since 2000 — Ludwig Forum für Internationale Kunst, Aachen, Germany
 2017 — Garage Triennial of Russian Contemporary Art — Garage museum, Moscow, Russia
 2017 — NAÏVE ... NO. Historical and stylistic parallels between naïve art and primitivism of the 20th and 21st centuries — Moscow Museum of Modern Art, Russia
 2014 — Pussy Riot and the cossacs: Russian Tradition of Art Resistance — Havremagasinet Art Center in Boden, Sweden
 2013 — Pussy Riot and the Russian Tradition of Art Rebellion — Meet Factory, Prague, Czech Republic

Awards
In 2010, Russian news organization Action named Loskutov "Young Person of the Year."

References

Russian performance artists
1986 births
Artists from Novosibirsk
Living people
Siberian nationalism
Amnesty International prisoners of conscience held by Russia